My Death Is a Mockery is a 1952 British crime film directed by Tony Young and starring Donald Houston, Kathleen Byron and Bill Kerr.

It was shot at the Brighton Studios as a second feature. The following year it attracted notoriety as the last film watched by Christopher Craig before he shot dead a policeman during a failed burglary.

Synopsis
After being condemned to death, a man recounts the events that have brought him there. A struggling Brixham fisherman, he was persuaded by an Australian chancer to switch to smuggling brandy from the French coast. However the murder of a policeman rapidly leads to things falling apart.

Cast
 Donald Houston as John Bradley  
 Kathleen Byron as Helen Bradley  
 Bill Kerr as Hansen  
 Eddie Leslie as Le Cambre  
 Liam Gaffney as Father Matthews  
 Kenneth Henry as Inspector  
 Felix Felton as Closterman  
 Sheila McCormack as Patsy - the Barmaid  
 Christopher Quest as First Customs Officer  
 Michael Voysey as Second Customs Officer  
 Vincent Holman as Prison Governor  
 Meadows White as Warder  
 Christmas Grose as Sailor

References

Bibliography
 Chibnall, Steve & McFarlane, Brian. The British 'B' Film. Palgrave MacMillan, 2009.

External links

1952 films
British crime films
1952 crime films
Films directed by Tony Young
Films set in France
Films set in Devon
Films set in London
Seafaring films
British black-and-white films
1950s English-language films
1950s British films